Delush Bazar (also Romanized as Delūsh Bāzār) is a village in Negur Rural District, Dashtiari District, Chabahar County, Sistan and Baluchestan Province, Iran. At the 2006 census, its population was 62, in 13 families.

References 

Populated places in Chabahar County